Nasser Hamad Al-Johar (born 6 January 1946) is a Saudi Arabian football coach and former player.

Club career
Al-Johar played for Al Nassr FC.

Managerial career
Al-Johar coached the Saudi Arabia national team for both the 2000 AFC Asian Cup (replacing Milan Máčala) and 2002 FIFA World Cup (after replacing Slobodan Santrač), though he was fired for failing to take the team to a Cup win that year.

When coach Hélio dos Anjos was fired in June 2008, Al-Johar was hired to replace him for the rest of the 2010 FIFA World Cup qualification. Al-Johar resigned from coaching The Green Falcons in February 2009 after the team lost to North Korea in the AFC Fourth Round of 2010 FIFA World Cup qualification; he was replaced with José Peseiro. The Saudi Arabia Football Federation announced the "reclusive" Al-Johar would continue to support the team as a "technical advisor".

After losing to the Syria national team on 9 January 2011, it was announced that Al-Johar would replace Peseiro throughout the remainder of the 2011 AFC Asian Cup; after two further losses (1–0 against Jordan and 5–0 against Japan), the perennial fix-it man for Saudi Arabia was again sacked less than two weeks after taking the helm.

References

1946 births
Al Nassr FC players
Living people
2000 AFC Asian Cup managers
2002 FIFA World Cup managers
2011 AFC Asian Cup managers
Saudi Arabian footballers
Saudi Arabia national football team managers
Al Nassr FC managers
Saudi Arabian football managers
Association footballers not categorized by position